Duhak is a village in Bilaspur District in Himachal Pradesh, India.
The village is about 15 km from the town of Ghumarwin and about 2 km from Berthin, which is the nearest place to purchase something.

Duhak has one middle school.

Villages in Bilaspur district, Himachal Pradesh